Charlie Reid may refer to:

Charlie Reid of The Proclaimers
Charlie Reid (ice hockey) (died 1953), ice hockey goaltender
Charlie Reid (footballer), Irish international footballer

See also
Charlie Reed (disambiguation)
Charles Reid (disambiguation)